Rudraksha Pally is a village in India, in Sathupally MD, Khammam District.

References

Villages in Khammam district